Hahl is a surname. Notable people with the surname include:

Albert Hahl (1868–1945), German colonial administrator
Riku Hahl (born 1980), Finnish ice hockey player
 (1847–1880), Finnish singer and singing teacher
Tom Hahl (born 1965), Finnish ten-pin bowler

See also
Hehl